The 1510s BC was a decade lasting from January 1, 1519 BC to December 31, 1510 BC.

Events and trends

 1512 BC—The flood of Deucalion, according to Ruaidhrí Ó Flaithbheartaigh, Augustine of Hippo, Eusebius, and Isidore of Seville

Significant people
Moses 

 

 1512
Installed the Aaronic priesthood at the foot of Mt Sinai..*[Lev 9:1-5,23,24]*